The ARIA Music Award for Breakthrough Artist – Release is an award presented at the annual ARIA Music Awards, which recognises "the many achievements of Aussie artists across all music genres", since 1987. It is handed out by the Australian Recording Industry Association (ARIA), an organisation whose aim is "to advance the interests of the Australian record industry."

Breakthrough awards for Album and Single were presented from 1989 until they were merged at the 2010 awards and renamed Breakthrough Artist – Release.

Winners and nominees
In the following table, the winner is highlighted in a separate colour, and in boldface; the nominees are those that are not highlighted or in boldface.

Notes
A: In 2011, Breakthrough Artist – Release was split into its two previous categories: Breakthrough Artist – Album and Breakthrough Artist – Single.

References

External links
The ARIA Awards Official website

B
Music awards for breakthrough artist